Beach Handball competition of the 2019 South American Beach Games in Rosario were held from 17 to 19 March at the Balneario La Florida.

Participating teams

Men

Women

Medal summary

Men's tournament

Group A

Group B

Knockout stage

Bracket

Final ranking

Women's tournament

Group A

Group B

Knockout stage

Bracket

Final ranking

References

External links

 2019 South American Beach Games Website

s
2019
Beach handball at multi-sport events
South American Beach Games